Bayview Heights is a hamlet in the Canadian province of Saskatchewan.

Geography 
It is located in The Battlefords Provincial Park on the eastern shore of Jackfish Lake.

Demographics 

References

Designated places in Saskatchewan
Meota No. 468, Saskatchewan
Organized hamlets in Saskatchewan
Division No. 17, Saskatchewan